Minä olen hullu is the third studio album by Finnish singer and songwriter Olavi Uusivirta.

Track listing

Charts

Release history

References

2008 albums
Olavi Uusivirta albums
Finnish-language albums